The City Fire Department in Columbus, Georgia, at 1338 and 1340 Broadway, is a former fire station which was built in 1920.  It was listed on the National Register of Historic Places in 1980.

It is Bungalow in style.

References

Fire stations on the National Register of Historic Places in Georgia (U.S. state)
National Register of Historic Places in Muscogee County, Georgia
Fire stations completed in 1920
1920 establishments in Georgia (U.S. state)
Buildings and structures in Columbus, Georgia